Prunum catochense is a species of sea snail, a marine gastropod mollusk in the family Marginellidae, the margin snails.

Description

Distribution
P. catochense can be found in the Gulf of Mexico, off the coast of Quintana Roo.

References

Marginellidae
Gastropods described in 2004